Peter Eure or Evers (ca. 1549–1612), of London and Washingborough, Lincolnshire, was an English politician.

He was a Member (MP) of the Parliament of England for Lincoln in 1589 and Derby in 1601.

References

1540s births
1612 deaths
Politicians from London
People from North Kesteven District
English MPs 1589
English MPs 1601